Akbar Abdi (born 26 August 1960) is an Iranian actor. He has received various accolades, including two Crystal Simorgh, a Hafez Award and an Iran's Film Critics and Writers Association Award.

Career 
He began his career in 1981 with the children’s TV series “The Traffic Neighborhood”, directed by Dariush Moadebian. His main credits include “The Actor”, “Delshodegan” and “The Snowman". He also acted in the film "Ejareh-Nesheenha" (The Tenants).

Abdi went through Kidney transplant in June 2016. He has been criticized for anti-Semitic remarks.

Filmography

Film

Web

Awards and nominations

 Receiving the Crystal Simorgh for the second role of a man from the 8th Fajr Film Festival for his role in Ali Hatami's film Mother (1989) 
 Receiving Crystal Simorgh for Best Supporting Actor from the 30th Fajr International Film Festival for his role in the film I Dream I Made by Reza Attaran
 Nominated for the 20th Fajr Film Festival Award for the film Bread, Love and Motor 1000

References

External links
 
 

Living people
Male actors from Tehran
Iranian male film actors
Iranian male television actors
Iranian male stage actors
People from Ardabil
21st-century Iranian male actors
20th-century Iranian male actors
1960 births
Recipients of the Order of Culture and Art
Crystal Simorgh for Best Supporting Actor winners